Ian Wright (born 1963) is an English football striker, who played for Crystal Palace, Arsenal and England, and is now a television presenter.

Ian Wright may also refer to:
Ian Wright (engineer), co-founder of Tesla Motors
Ian Wright (footballer, born 1972), English football defender, who played for Bristol Rovers, Hull City and Hereford United, amongst others
Ian Wright (illustrator) (born 1953)
Ian Wright (percussionist), British classical percussionist
Ian Wright (rower) (born 1961), New Zealand Olympic rower
Ian Wright (traveller) (born 1965), English traveller and television presenter, and host of Globe Trekker

See also
Iain Wright (born 1972), British Labour politician